Šentjurij na Dolenjskem is a village in the Municipality of Mirna Peč in southeastern Slovenia. The area is part of the historical region of Lower Carniola. The municipality is now included in the Southeast Slovenia Statistical Region.

Name
The name of the settlement was changed from Šent Jurij to Šentjurij na Dolenjskem in 1955.

Church
The local church from which the settlement gets its name is dedicated to Saint George and belongs to the Parish of Mirna Peč. It dates to the late 16th century with some later adaptations.

Notable people
Notable people that were born or lived in Šentjurij na Dolenjskem include:
Tone Pavček (1928–2011), poet

References

External links
Šentjurij na Dolenjskem on Geopedia

Populated places in the Municipality of Mirna Peč